Blastobasis tarda is a moth of the family Blastobasidae. It is found in Australia in Queensland and New South Wales.. It is an introduced species in North America, where it has been found in southern California. It has also been reported from France. There is a species in New Zealand that is very similar in appearance to B. tarda that has yet to be formally described.

The wingspan is about 15 mm. Adults have brown forewings with fringes along the inner margin that are longer than the width of the rest of the wing. The hindwings are paler and narrower and have fringes along the costa and even longer ones along the inner margin. Adults are sexually dimorphic.

References

External links
Lectotype specimen held at the Natural History Museum, London.
Australian Faunal Directory
Australian Insects

Moths of Australia
Blastobasis
Moths of New Zealand
Moths described in 1902